Shea Michael Weber (born August 14, 1985) is a Canadian professional ice hockey defenceman under contract with the Arizona Coyotes of the National Hockey League (NHL). He played sixteen seasons in the NHL for the Nashville Predators and Montreal Canadiens. He is known to have one of the hardest shots in hockey history.

Drafted in the second round, 49th overall, by the Predators in the 2003 NHL Entry Draft, Weber spent eleven seasons in Nashville until being traded to Montreal in 2016. He previously played for the Sicamous Eagles of the Kootenay International Junior Hockey League (KIJHL), the Kelowna Rockets of the Western Hockey League (WHL), and the Milwaukee Admirals of the American Hockey League (AHL).

Weber has represented Canada at a number of International Ice Hockey Federation (IIHF)-sanctioned events, winning a World Junior Ice Hockey Championship gold medal in 2005, an Ice Hockey World Championships gold medal in 2007, and two Olympic gold medals at the 2010 and 2014 Winter Olympics.

Early life
Weber was born on August 14, 1985, in Sicamous, British Columbia. His mother, Tracy, was a hairdresser, and his father, James Weber, a sawmill worker. Weber first played organized ice hockey at age six. Growing up, he played in the Sicamous and District Minor Hockey Association, a division of the British Columbia Amateur Hockey Association (BCAHA), often switching between forward and defenceman positions. In Weber's second year of bantam, he permanently switched to defence. He credits his father for convincing him to make the switch because he thought Weber would "have a better shot at a pro career as a defenceman". Between the ages of fourteen and fifteen, Weber grew 5 inches, from 5-foot-9 (1.75 metres) to 6-foot-2 (1.88 metres).

Playing career

Junior career
Weber went unselected in his Western Hockey League (WHL) Bantam Draft year, but was placed by the Kelowna Rockets on their protected-players list during his second season of bantam. At the end of the season, he moved up to junior "B" ice hockey with his hometown Sicamous Eagles of the Kootenay International Junior Hockey League (KIJHL). Weber's 42 points in 47 games played helped his team to a near-perfect season of 43–5–1–1, winning both the British Columbian Cyclone Taylor Cup KIJHL league championship and the Western Canadian Keystone Cup. In the Keystone Cup championship game, Weber scored the Eagles' first goal of the game in a 2–1 victory over the Spruce Grove Regals. In addition to his championship run with the Eagles, Weber played in five games for the Kelowna Rockets during their 2001–02 WHL season.

The following season Weber began his rookie season with the Rockets. Early into the campaign, Weber established a physical presence, often fighting opposing players. Overall, he had 167 penalty minutes that season, the most in his entire playing career. Offensively, Weber finished his rookie season with eighteen points in seventy games played. He also scored 5 points in 19 playoff games as the Rockets won the franchise's first Ed Chynoweth Cup as WHL champions, defeating the Red Deer Rebels in the finals. As WHL champions, the Rockets represented the WHL at the 2003 Memorial Cup in Quebec City, Quebec, where they were defeated by the Hull Olympiques 2–1 in the semi-final. At the completion of his rookie WHL season, Weber was eligible to be drafted into the National Hockey League (NHL) at the 2003 NHL Entry Draft. Heading into the draft, he was ranked 42nd among North American skaters by the NHL Central Scouting Bureau and 54th overall by International Scouting Services. On June 21, 2003, he was drafted in the second round, 49th overall, by the Nashville Predators.

In his second season with the Rockets, Weber was named to the WHL roster for the 2004 ADT Canada-Russia Challenge in Red Deer and Lethbridge, Alberta. In the two games played, he recorded one assist. At the completion of the regular season, Weber had improved his offensive statistics from the previous season, recording 32 points in 60 games. Weber was named the WHL player of the week for April 6–12, 2004, after recording one goal and six assists in four Kelowna wins over the Tri-City Americans as the Rockets eliminated the Americans four games to two in the Western Conference semi-finals. He finished the WHL playoffs with 17 points in 17 games as the Rockets were eliminated four games to three by the Everett Silvertips in the Western Conference finals. Despite being eliminated from the WHL playoffs, the Rockets advanced to their second consecutive Memorial Cup as the host team. At the 2004 Memorial Cup, Weber was named to the tournament all-star team after recording four points in four games played as the Rockets defeated the Gatineau Olympiques 2–1 in the championship game to win their first Memorial Cup. At the completion of the season, Weber was named to the WHL Western Conference's second all-star team.

Weber's final season with the Rockets proved to be his best with the team, despite a late season injury. On March 5, 2005, he injured his left knee after colliding with Vancouver Giants left winger Cam Cunning. The injury resulted in Weber missing the remainder of the regular season and the Rockets' Western Conference quarter-finals series against the Vancouver Giants. Despite the injury, Weber finished the regular season with WHL career bests for goals (12), assists (29) and points (41) in 55 games played. After returning from injury, Weber scored 9 goals and 17 points in 18 playoff games as the Rockets won the Ed Chynoweth Cup en route to their third consecutive Memorial Cup. For his efforts, he was awarded the airBC Trophy as the most valuable player of the WHL playoffs. At the 2005 Memorial Cup, with what was considered as one of the best tournament fields in Memorial Cup history, the Rockets were eliminated after losing all three of their round robin games. At the completion of the season, Weber was named to the WHL Western Conference first all-star team and was the Western Conference nominee for the Bill Hunter Memorial Trophy as the top defenceman in the WHL, although Dion Phaneuf ultimately won the award. Weber was also named to the Canadian Major Junior second all-star team.

Nashville Predators

On September 10, 2004, Weber signed a three-year, $1.425 million entry-level contract with the Nashville Predators. A year-and-a-half later, Weber made his NHL debut on January 6, 2006, against the Detroit Red Wings, recording three shots on goal in 11:08 minutes of icetime. Three months later, on April 6, 2006, he scored his first NHL goal, against Reinhard Divis of the St. Louis Blues in a 3–0 Nashville victory. Weber went on to play in 28 games during his rookie season, finishing with two goals and ten assists. He also scored two goals in four Stanley Cup playoff games with the Predators before the team was eliminated in the first round by the San Jose Sharks. With Nashville's American Hockey League (AHL) affiliate, the Milwaukee Admirals, still in playoff action, Weber was reassigned to the Admirals' roster for the remainder of the AHL playoffs. He recorded 6 goals and 5 assists in 14 games during his time with the Admirals, who finished in second place in the Calder Cup, losing to the Hershey Bears in six games in the Calder Cup Finals.

It was during his sophomore season Weber evolved into one of Nashville's most important players. By the midpoint of the season, Weber already had 26 points, and his play was recognized on January 14, 2007, when he was named to the Western Conference roster for the 2007 NHL YoungStars Game in Dallas, Texas. Weber finished the season with 40 points, ranking eighth on the Predators' roster in total points. He added an additional three assists in five playoff games before the Predators were eliminated by San Jose for the second consecutive season.

Weber's third season with the Predators began with a series of injuries. After playing only 2:19 minutes of the first period in Nashville's season-opening game against the Colorado Avalanche, Weber fell awkwardly and dislocated his kneecap. The injury caused him to miss the next six weeks of play before returning to the Nashville line-up during a game with the St. Louis Blues on November 17, 2007. Weber was sidelined again shortly after, injuring his leg and missing another 11 games before he returned during a January 15, 2008, game against the Calgary Flames. Weber finished the season with 20 points in 54 games. He received a single fifth-place vote to tie for 17th with seven other players in James Norris Memorial Trophy voting as the NHL's best defenceman.

On June 23, 2008, Weber signed a three-year, $13.5 million contract extension with the Predators, avoiding restricted free agency. During his first year of the new contract, Weber established himself as one of the top defenceman in the NHL. At the mid-way point of the season, he was among the defencemen statistical leaders, was considered a favourite to win the Norris Trophy and was named to the Western Conference roster for the 2009 National Hockey League All-Star Game in Montreal. Weber finished the season with career-highs in all major statistical categories, including games played (81), goals (23), assists (30), points (53) and penalty minutes (80). His 23 goals set a new Predators franchise record for goals by a defenceman in a single season. Although he received no first-place votes, Weber finished fourth in the Norris Trophy voting with 186 voting points, behind winner Zdeno Chára (1,034 points) and runners-up Mike Green (982 points) and Nicklas Lidström (733 points). Weber narrowly missed being named to the NHL second All-Star team after receiving four-first place votes and 172 voting points, a single voting point behind Dan Boyle, the final defenceman selected.

Entering his fifth season with the Predators, Weber continued his stellar record. At the February Olympic break, Weber accumulated 35 points in 59 games for the Predators. He also established a strong leadership role and willingness to defend his teammates, highlighted by three consecutive games in March 2010 in which he fought opposing players. Weber's offensive production slowed after the Olympic break and he finished the season with 43 points in 78 games played. Despite a decrease in offence from the previous season, Weber was a Norris Trophy candidate for the third consecutive year, receiving one first-place vote and 96 voting points to finish as the sixth runner-up behind winner Duncan Keith (1,096 points). Weber also received a single fifth-place vote, tying for 23rd with six other players in Hart Memorial Trophy voting, and was the seventh-ranked defenceman in NHL All-Star team voting with 83 voting points.

On July 8, 2010, Weber was named the fifth captain in Nashville Predators history, replacing Jason Arnott, who was traded to the New Jersey Devils. He became the youngest captain in franchise history and the only Predators captain to have been drafted by the team. Weber recorded his 200th career NHL point—an assist—in a game against the Detroit Red Wings on February 9, 2011. At the conclusion of the regular season, Weber was named one of three finalists—along with Zdeno Chára and Nicklas Lidström—for the Norris Trophy, the first finalist nomination of his career. He finished second in Norris Trophy voting, losing with 727 voting points to Lidström's 736. For the first time in his career, Weber was voted to the NHL first All-Star team after receiving 445 voting points, second among defencemen to Lidström's 464. Although Weber became a restricted free agent on July 1, he said he wanted to remain with the Predators. To prevent the possibility of other teams signing him to an offer sheet, the Predators filed for salary arbitration with Weber, giving the team and Weber until their hearing to negotiate a new contract. Failing to come to terms on a new contract by their hearing, Weber's case went to arbitration on August 2, the first time in NHL history a team-elected arbitration candidate had reached a hearing. The following day, he was awarded a one-year, $7.5 million contract from which the Predators could not walk away, as the team had opted for arbitration.

In the first month of the 2011–12 season, Weber hit forward Jannik Hansen from behind in a game against Vancouver on October 20, 2011. While Hansen was uninjured on the play, Weber was fined $2,500 – the maximum allowable financial penalty – by the NHL the following day.

In Nashville's first game of the 2012 Stanley Cup Quarterfinals, against Detroit, Weber slammed centre Henrik Zetterberg's head into the glass boards during the closing seconds of the game after being hit by Zetterberg. The force of the blow cracked Zetterberg's helmet but he suffered no injury and played in the next game. As punishment, the NHL imposed a $2,500 fine (the maximum allowable under the NHL Collective Bargaining Agreement [CBA] at the time) on Weber for retaliatory action. NHL commissioner Gary Bettman was in attendance at this game. Weber finished the regular season leading all defencemen in shorthanded goals scored, with two.

In the 2012 off-season, with the Predators unable to take Weber to arbitration again (a player can only be subjected to team-elected arbitration once in his career), Weber signed a front-loaded $110 million, 14-year offer sheet ($68 million of it as a signing bonus) from the Philadelphia Flyers on July 19. The offer sheet was the richest in NHL history in terms of total money, money per season, and length; surpassing the previous offer sheet record set by Thomas Vanek. Already having lost Weber's defensive partner Ryan Suter to unrestricted free agency, the Predators matched the offer sheet five days later. Following the 2012–13 NHL lockout, the CBA was changed to prevent teams from signing other players to similar deals.

For the 2013–14 season, Weber led all NHL defencemen with 23 goals, which also matched his career-high. He broke Kimmo Timonen's Predator record for single-season points by a defenceman with 56 points, which also led the Predators for the season. On April 28, Weber was named a finalist for the Norris Trophy for the third time in his career; the other finalists were Zdeno Chára and Duncan Keith, the latter of which won the award. Weber finished third in voting.

Weber was again voted to the NHL second All-Star team for the 2014–2015 season, his fourth post-season All-Star team selection.

During the 2015–16 season, Weber recorded his first career hat-trick on December 5 against the Detroit Red Wings, which was also the first-ever by a Predators defenceman. Weber would continue his goal-scoring ways, tying Paul Kariya's franchise record for power-play goals in a season with 14 and finishing with his third 20+ goal season. Weber was also named a finalist for the Mark Messier Leadership Award, which he won.

Montreal Canadiens
On June 29, 2016, Weber was traded to the Montreal Canadiens in exchange for P. K. Subban. The trade surprised many ice hockey fans because the details of this trade were kept strictly confidential until the deal was already made. Weber's first season with the Canadiens was rather successful offensively, recording 17 goals and 42 points in 78 games. In six post-season games, Weber recorded three points during the team's first-round elimination to the New York Rangers.

Weber only managed to skate in 26 games for Montreal the following season after suffering a tendon tear in his left foot. During the 2018–19 off-season, it was announced he was expected to be out of the Canadiens lineup until mid-December.

On October 1, 2018, Weber was named the 30th captain of the Canadiens, replacing Max Pacioretty after he was traded to the Vegas Golden Knights on September 10, 2018. However, Weber did not join the Canadiens lineup until November 27 due to an injury during the offseason that required surgery. In his second game back, he scored two goals in a 5–2 win against the New York Rangers.

On February 2, 2021, Weber played his 1,000th game in a 5–3 win against the Vancouver Canucks.

The rest of Weber's 2020–21 season was plagued by lingering injuries. Montreal reached the playoffs, where Weber played injured. Even in those circumstances, he led the team's top defensive line and on-ice time, guiding them to a surprisingly deep playoff run that took them all the way to the Stanley Cup Finals. Montreal ended up losing to the Tampa Bay Lightning in five games. After the end of the season, Montreal's front office announced that the physical toll of Weber's injuries was too significant for him to overcome and that he would not be playing in the 2021–22 season, with the possibility of early retirement despite five years remaining on his contract.

Later years
On June 16, 2022, Weber's contract was traded by the Canadiens to the Vegas Golden Knights in exchange for Evgenii Dadonov. The Golden Knights acquired Weber's contract for purposes of salary cap relief, and there was not an expectation that he would play for the team.

On February 22, 2023, the Golden Knights traded Weber's contract and a fifth-round pick in 2023 to the Arizona Coyotes in exchange for Dysin Mayo.

International play

Throughout his career, Weber has represented Canada at several international ice hockey tournaments. His first experience with Hockey Canada came for the national junior team, when, on December 22, 2004, he was named to the roster for the 2005 World Junior Ice Hockey Championships in Grand Forks, North Dakota. There, his play with Dion Phaneuf formed the team's top defensive pair, helping Canada win its first junior gold medal since the 1997 tournament. Despite being held pointless throughout the tournament, Weber finished tied for third among plus-minus leaders with a rating of +10.

Weber debuted with the national senior team on April 22, 2007, accepting an invitation to join the club for the 2007 IIHF World Championship in Russia. However, his experience in this tournament was interrupted by an incident for which he was suspended three games. One minute into Canada's preliminary round game against Germany, Weber hit Yannic Seidenberg in the chin with his elbow, giving the German a concussion and sidelining him for the remainder of the tournament. After serving his suspension, Weber continued with the tournament, finishing with two points in six games, including a goal in Canada's 5–1 quarter-final victory over Switzerland. Canada went on to win the gold medal in the tournament, defeating Finland 4–2 in the final.

On April 14, 2009, Weber was named to the national senior team for the 2009 IIHF World Championship in Switzerland, as one of four alternate captains. In Canada's final preliminary round game, Weber was named Canada's VIP after scoring one goal and three assists as Canada defeated Slovakia 7–3. Weber finished the tournament with four goals and eight assists for 12 points in nine games played, leading all defencemen in tournament scoring and finishing tied for third overall among all skaters. Despite being defeated by Russia 2–1 in the gold medal game, Weber was named to the tournament all-star team and was awarded the tournament's Best Defenceman award.

On July 2, 2009, Weber was invited to the Canadian orientation camp for the 2010 Winter Olympics in Vancouver. On December 30, 2009, he was named to the final Canadian roster for the tournament. In Canada's qualification round game against Germany, Weber scored Canada's second goal of the game in an 8–2 victory. His shot passed through the mesh net behind German goaltender Thomas Greiss and a video review was required to award the goal. Weber finished the tournament with six points in seven games, ranking second amongst defencemen in terms of scoring, and was named to the tournament's all-star team, which defeated the United States 3–2 in overtime to win the gold medal. Weber, along with his British Columbian teammates from the Olympic team, were inducted into the BC Sports Hall of Fame in September 2011.

After his Nashville Predators failed to make the 2013 Stanley Cup playoffs, Weber was considered a lock for the 2013 World Championship team, but Hockey Canada deemed the cost of insuring his large NHL contract too high and ultimately did not select him.

Weber was named an alternate captain for Canada in the 2014 Winter Olympics in Sochi, where Canada repeated as gold medallists. He was also an alternate captain for Canada's champion team at the 2016 World Cup in Toronto.

Personal life
Weber has a brother, Brandon, who is two years younger. Brandon grew up playing hockey with Shea's former Predators teammate Cody Franson. When Weber was 14, his mother underwent surgery to remove brain tumors, but in early 2010 had a series of seizures, was placed in an induced coma, and died on August 11, 2010.

On July 20, 2013, Weber married high school sweetheart, Bailey Munro, whom he had met while playing junior hockey in Kelowna. The couple have three children together.

Career statistics

Regular season and playoffs

International

Awards and achievements

CHL / WHL

NHL

International

References

External links

 

1985 births
Living people
Canadian expatriate ice hockey players in the United States
Canadian ice hockey defencemen
Ice hockey people from British Columbia
Ice hockey players at the 2010 Winter Olympics
Ice hockey players at the 2014 Winter Olympics
Kelowna Rockets players
Medalists at the 2010 Winter Olympics
Medalists at the 2014 Winter Olympics
Milwaukee Admirals players
Montreal Canadiens players
Nashville Predators draft picks
Nashville Predators players
National Hockey League All-Stars
Olympic gold medalists for Canada
Olympic ice hockey players of Canada
Olympic medalists in ice hockey
People from the Columbia-Shuswap Regional District
Sportspeople from British Columbia